The Under Secretary of Veterans Affairs for Health is a sub-cabinet position in the United States Department of Veterans Affairs. Formerly known as the Chief Medical Director of Veterans Health, the Undersecretary is the highest official directly responsible to the Secretary for the Veterans Health Administration, which is the largest agency within the department. Although the position is no longer required to be held by a licensed physician (as of 2004), senior medical professionals such as hospital administrators are typically the preferred selectee for nomination, based on both demonstrated ability in the medical profession or health care administration, and with substantial experience in Veterans healthcare or similar programs.

From 2017 through July 2022, the position was vacant, with the last Senate-confirmed holder being Dr. David Shulkin, who was elevated to become the Secretary on February 14, 2017.  As was the norm during much of the Trump administration, the position was filled by a myriad persons designated as acting undersecretary. Between 2018 and 2021, the position was held by Dr. Richard Stone, MD. Following his resignation in July 2021, Deputy Under Secretary Dr. Steven. L. Lieberman assumed his duties. On March 19, 2022, President Biden announced his intention to nominate Dr. Shereef Elnahal to serve as undersecretary.  Dr. Elnahal was confirmed by the Senate on July 21, 2022 and assumed his office the same day.

List of Undersecretaries for Health

References

United States Department of Veterans Affairs officials